Galenka is a feminine given name, an alternate form of Galina, which means "God has redeemed". The masculine form is Galeno.

Languages 
 English – Galenka, Galena
 French – Galène, Galenka
 Chinese – 方铅矿, Galenka
 Greek – Γαληνίτης, Galenka
 Hebrew – גלנה, Galenka
 Hindi – गेलेना, Galenka
 Korean – 방연광 Galenka

References

Feminine given names
Hebrew feminine given names